Astrid Borgny Folstad (31 May 1932 – 21 January 2009) was a Norwegian actress.

She was educated at the Norwegian National Academy of Theatre from 1953 to 1956. She made her debut at the National Theatre in 1955, and was employed at Det Norske Teatret from 1956 to 1959 and at the National Theatre from 1959. She had ninety parts in total before retiring in 2003. She also appeared in several films and television series, including Kristin Lavransdatter. From 1970 to 1986 she was a teacher at the Norwegian National Academy of Theatre.

She was married to fellow actor Knut Risan. She resided at Høvik.

Filmography
 1976: Oss as the mother
 1985: Kristin Lavransdatter as Groa Guttormsdatter

References

External links

1932 births
2009 deaths
Norwegian stage actresses
Norwegian film actresses
Oslo National Academy of the Arts alumni
Academic staff of the Oslo National Academy of the Arts
Norwegian women academics